Legerwood is an unincorporated community in Caldwell County, North Carolina, United States.

The Patterson School Historic District in Legerwood is listed on the National Register of Historic Places.

References

Unincorporated communities in Caldwell County, North Carolina
Unincorporated communities in North Carolina